The 1986 Brisbane Rugby League premiership was the 77th season of Brisbane's semi-professional rugby league football competition. Nine teams from across Brisbane competed for the premiership, which culminated in a grand final match between the Wynnum-Manly and Past Brothers clubs.

Season summary 
Teams played each other three times, with 24 rounds of competition played. It resulted in a top four of Wynnum-Manly, Redcliffe, Past Brothers and Fortitude Valley.

Teams

Ladder 

Source:

Finals

Grand Final 

Wynnum-Manly 14 (Tries: W. Lewis, P. Attel. Goals: C. Scott 3.)

Brothers 6 (Try: P. Gill. Goal: T. Bailey.)

Winfield State League 

The 1986 Winfield State League was the inaugural season of the Queensland Rugby League's statewide competition. A total of 14 teams competed in the season, 8 of which were BRL Premiership clubs. The remaining six were regional teams from across the state, hence the State League name. The Seagulls would pull off a massive victory in the semi-finals against Ipswich, before defeating Redcliffe by a large margin in the Grand Final to win their third consecutive Winfield State League title.

References

Rugby league in Brisbane
Brisbane Rugby League season